Shona Tucker is an American actress and director. Beginning in the 1990s, she had roles in several television shows including Law & Order and New York Undercover. She has appeared in regional theater, including at the Oregon Shakespeare Festival, Off-Broadway at The Public Theater and elsewhere, in films such as 2016's King Cobra, and on Broadway in original cast of 2018's To Kill a Mockingbird with Jeff Daniels, and Death of a Salesman with Wendell Pierce. She is the Mary Riepma Ross professor in Drama at Vassar College, and has been teaching there since 2008.

Life and career
Tucker was born in Louisville Kentucky, where she began acting at the Louisville Youth Performing Arts School. While still in high school, she began her long relationship with Actors Theatre of Louisville as assistant to Paul Owen, the resident scenic designer as an intern on The Louisville Zoo 2.  She has returned to perform at Actors Theatre in five different plays.

A Fulbright Scholar, a Schomburg Fellow, and an Audelco Award winner, she earned a BS from Northwestern University and MFA in Acting at NYU's Tisch School of the Arts. She has served as Professor of Drama at Vassar College from 2008 to the present.

She was a company member at Oregon Shakespeare Festival from 2005 to 2008, acting in such plays as Fences, A Midsummer Night's Dream, Gem of the Ocean, and Bus Stop.

Her Off-Broadway theatre credits include productions at New York Theatre Workshop, Lincoln Center Theater Directors' Lab, The Public Theater, Circle in the Square, Playwrights Horizons, Manhattan Theatre Club, and La MaMa Experimental Theatre Club.

She played the role of Rita in the world premiere of the award-winning play Eclipsed at Yale Repertory Theatre. She also created the roles of Sherry and Dr. Toros in Pulitzer Prize finalist Amy Herzog's Mary Jane, also at Yale Repertory Theatre. She created the roles of Angela and Angie in the world premiere of Tough Titty at Williamstown Theatre Festival.

Her feature film credits include: The Hating Game (2021), James Franco's King Cobra (2016), Keane (2004), Preaching to the Choir (2005) and Boys on the Side (1995) with Whoopi Goldberg and Mary-Louise Parker.

Tucker has played roles in a number of television series including New York Undercover (recurring), Queens Supreme, Law & Order, and Third Watch. She has also acted in several TV movies and shorts.

Works

Stage

Broadway

Off-Broadway

Regional Theater

Film

Television

References

External links
 
 

Living people
American stage actresses
American theatre directors
Women theatre directors
American film actresses
Year of birth missing (living people)
Vassar College faculty
Actresses from Louisville, Kentucky
American women academics
21st-century American women